Frederick Ryan (1876 – April 1913), was an Irish, Dublin-born playwright, journalist and socialist.

Career
Ryan became secretary of the Irish National Theatre Society in 1902. There he would create realistic satire with the play The Laying of the Foundations. He was a member of the Celtic Literature Society and frequently wrote on political issues.

Ryan joined James Connolly’s Irish Socialist Republican Party, and would become the national secretary of the Socialist Party of Ireland. He was also a member of the Young Irelanders branch of the United Irish League.

He lived in Cairo as editor of the Egyptian Standard, from 1907 to 1909, then was organiser for the Irish Socialist Party. He edited Wilfrid Scawen Blunt’s Egypt in London. He died in Blunt's house of appendicitis in 1913.

References

1876 births
1913 deaths
Irish socialists
Irish dramatists and playwrights
Irish male dramatists and playwrights
Irish political writers